Tom Spinks (born 11 July 1975) is a British former professional tennis player.

Biography
Spinks, a right-handed player from Norfolk, was the highest ranked player to compete at the 1999 Wimbledon Championships, after receiving entry to the main draw as a wildcard. He lost in the first round to Switzerland's Lorenzo Manta in a two hour and 42 minute long four-set match. Spinks came from 2–5 down to claim the first set in a tiebreak, then lost further tiebreaks in the next two sets, before the Swiss player took the fourth 6–2.

As a doubles player, Spinks played in three editions of Wimbledon, with a best result the second round in 1996, with Ross Matheson. He also appeared twice in the doubles at the Bournemouth International and once at the Nottingham Open. In 2000 he partnered with Martin Hromec to win the Kyoto Challenger.

Challenger titles

Doubles: (1)

References

External links
 
 

1975 births
Living people
English male tennis players
British male tennis players
Tennis people from Norfolk